The First United Presbyterian Church at 400 E. 4th St. in Loveland, Colorado was built in 1905.  It was designed by architect Montezuma Fuller.  It was listed on the National Register of Historic Places in 2004.

It was designed by architect Montezuma Fuller with an Akron Plan interior and an exterior having elements of Romanesque Revival and Gothic Revival styles.

Currently, the building is used as a house of worship affiliated with the PCUSA as a member of the Presbytery of Plains and Peaks.

More information can be found on the congregation website - https://www.1ston4th.com/

Additionally, the building features a historic pipe organ constructed by the Möller Organ Company in 1914. It is currently the oldest pipe organ still in its original condition in the state of Colorado. This instrument is one of the last existing in its original state as a Tubular-pneumatic action pipe organ.

A renovation and cleaning took place in 2014. More details about this instrument can be found here -  https://pipeorgandatabase.org/organ/42273

References

Churches on the National Register of Historic Places in Colorado
Romanesque Revival church buildings in Colorado
Presbyterian churches in Colorado
Churches completed in 1906
Buildings and structures in Larimer County, Colorado
National Register of Historic Places in Larimer County, Colorado
1906 establishments in Colorado